Maqhamusela Khanyile (c 1850 - 1877) was the first South African Christian martyr.

Background 

Khanyile lived in Zululand at the time of King Cetshwayo. Cetshwayo's predecessor  King Shaka devised the ibutho system as the centre pillar of the Zulu state. Young men were required to serve as soldiers until they were about 30 years old, after which they were allowed to marry. A conversation between King Cetshwayo and the Norwegian missionary, Rev JL Kyllingstad in 1876 was recorded as follows: 

Zulu state power was based on this system of conscription. From puberty until late their 30s, men worked for the king.  People were allowed to live, study and work at mission stations, and to embark on the process to conversion to Christianity, but the final step of baptism was not accepted by the Zulu chiefs and kings.

Khanyile lived near the Norwegian Mission Society (NMS) station at Eshowe, the Zulu people named the mission uMondi after Ommund Oftebro, the superintendent of the NMS.  On the day before Khanyile's death, Oftebro informed him that he had an audience with King Cetshwayo in order to obtain the king's permission to baptise Khanyile. Cetshwayo  declined to give his permission before consulting with the local chief.

Khanyile knew that his life was in danger and he said to Oftebro:

Martyrdom 

Khanyile was shot on a hillside outside Eshowe on 9 March 1877, becoming the first South African Christian martyr. Du Plessis reported in A History of Christian Missions in South Africa

This incident became another reason for the British invasion of the Zulu Kingdom in 1879.

Commemoration 

The Anglican Church of Southern Africa commemorates Khanyile in its Calendar of saints on the 9th day of March each year.  In addition the collect for this commemoration is as follows:
God our strength and our redeemer
your servant Maqhamusela of Zululand
chose to suffer insults, persecution and death
rather than betray your Son:
grant that we your disciples may follow you with allour hearts
and that nothing may separate us from you;
through Jesus Christ our Lord, Amen

In 1926, a committee chaired by K. S. Zungu and Reverend L. O. Aadnesgaard started to collect funds to put up a memorial to Khanyile. The man in charge of the eShowe mission, Reverend S. Solberg, designed the monument to be erected on Mpondweni hill close to the place where the execution had taken place.

The Norwegian missionary, Rev'd P. A. Rodseth interviewed many people about the life and death of Khanyile and he reported his findings in The South African Church Weekly Newsletter of 3 March 1937.

In 1939, they erected a concrete cross on Mpondweni hill. The inscription read: 

In 1951, the Lutheran Bible School was named after Khanyile and on 3 March 1981 a new cross of steel replaced the concrete cross.

The Premier of KwaZulu-Natal and the Evangelical Lutheran Church in Southern Africa arranged a commemoration celebration on kwaMondi on 11 March 2007. The Premier of KwaZulu-Natal, Sbu Ndebele unveiled the new monument on 11 March 2007.

Notes

References

Sources

 
 
 
 
 
 
 
 Cubbin, Tony (1988). "Maqhamusela Khanyile: First Christian Martyr of the Norwegian Lutheran Mission Society", Zululand Historical Society,

External links 
 Additional Collects for African Commemorations

19th-century Christian martyrs
19th-century Protestant martyrs
Year of birth uncertain
1877 deaths